Helius is a genus of crane fly in the family Limoniidae.

Distribution
Worldwide, but the Australasian and Oriental regions are the most species rich.

Species
Subgenus Eurhamphidia Alexander, 1915
H. abnormalis (Brunetti, 1918)
H. ata Alexander, 1931
H. atroapicalis Alexander, 1978
H. auranticolor Alexander, 1936
H. connectus Edwards, 1928
H. diacanthus Alexander, 1931
H. fuscofemoratus Alexander, 1931
H. glabristylatus Alexander, 1931
H. indivisus Alexander, 1931
H. inelegans (Alexander, 1928)
H. invenustipes (Alexander, 1930)
H. melanosoma Alexander, 1936
H. mimicans Edwards, 1933
H. mirus Edwards, 1926
H. monticola (Edwards, 1919)
H. mouensis Alexander, 1948
H. nigrofemoratus (Alexander, 1930)
H. niveitarsis (Skuse, 1890)
H. pallens Edwards, 1933
H. perelegans Alexander, 1930
H. perlongatus Alexander, 1978
H. scabiosus Alexander, 1932
H. vitiensis Alexander, 1956
Subgenus Helius Lepeletier & Serville, 1828
H. acanthostyla Alexander, 1944
H. aciferus Alexander, 1937
H. aka Alexander, 1972
H. albitarsis (Osten Sacken, 1888)
H. albogeniculatus Alexander, 1936
H. amplus Edwards, 1933
H. anaemicus Alexander, 1932
H. anamalaiensis Alexander, 1967
H. angustalbus Alexander, 1953
H. aphrophilus Alexander, 1948
H. apicalis (Alexander, 1915)
H. apoensis Alexander, 1931
H. apophysalis Alexander, 1967
H. araucariae Alexander, 1945
H. arcuarius Alexander, 1929
H. argyrosternus Alexander, 1930
H. arunachalus Alexander, 1975
H. attenuatus Alexander, 1929
H. barbatus Edwards, 1921
H. bicolor Edwards, 1933
H. bifurcus Alexander, 1956
H. bitergatus Alexander, 1950
H. boops Alexander, 1942
H. brachyphallus Alexander, 1956
H. brevioricornis (Alexander, 1920)
H. brevisector Alexander, 1956
H. brunneus Byers, 1981
H. cacoxenus (Alexander, 1920)
H. calviensis Edwards, 1928
H. capensis (Alexander, 1917)
H. capniopterus Alexander, 1945
H. catreus Alexander, 1967
H. cavernicolus Alexander, 1961
H. chikurinensis Alexander, 1930
H. chintoo Theischinger, 1994
H. communis (Skuse, 1890)
H. comoreanus Alexander, 1959
H. compactus Alexander, 1967
H. copiosus Alexander, 1935
H. corniger Savchenko, 1983
H. costofimbriatus Alexander, 1930
H. costosetosus Alexander, 1932
H. creper Alexander, 1926
H. ctenonycha Alexander, 1938
H. dafla Alexander, 1972
H. darlingtonae Welch & Gelhaus, 1994
H. destitutus Alexander, 1971
H. devinctus Alexander, 1932
H. distinervis Alexander, 1940
H. dolichorhynchus Edwards, 1933
H. eremnophallus Alexander, 1978
H. euryphallus Alexander, 1960
H. fasciventris Edwards, 1926
H. ferruginosus (Brunetti, 1912)
H. flavidibasis Alexander, 1975
H. flavipes (Macquart, 1855)
H. flavitarsis (Alexander, 1920)
H. flavus (Walker, 1856)
H. fragosus Alexander, 1937
H. franckianus Alexander, 1940
H. fratellus (Brunetti, 1918)
H. fulvithorax (Skuse, 1890)
H. fumicosta Edwards, 1928
H. fuscoangustus Alexander, 1967
H. garcianus Alexander, 1972
H. gibbifer Savchenko, 1981
H. gorokanus Alexander, 1962
H. gracillimus Alexander, 1938
H. graphipterus Alexander, 1954
H. haemorrhoidalis Alexander, 1937
H. harrisi (Alexander, 1923)
H. hatschbachi Alexander, 1954
H. hispanicus Lackschewitz, 1928
H. hova Alexander, 1955
H. impensus Alexander, 1967
H. imperfectus (Alexander, 1920)
H. inconspicuus (Brunetti, 1912)
H. ineptus Alexander, 1938
H. infirmus Alexander, 1932
H. invariegatus Alexander, 1938
H. iris (Alexander, 1920)
H. kambangani (de Meijere, 1913)
H. kambanganoides Alexander, 1931
H. larotypa Alexander, 1926
H. lectus Alexander, 1936
H. leucoplaca Alexander, 1936
H. lienpingensis Alexander, 1945
H. liguliferus Alexander, 1978
H. liliputanus Alexander, 1929
H. lobuliferus Alexander, 1938
H. longinervis Edwards, 1928
H. longirostris (Meigen, 1818)
H. luachimoensis Alexander, 1963
H. luniger (Riedel, 1914)
H. mainensis (Alexander, 1916)
H. malagasicus Alexander, 1955
H. manueli Alexander, 1972
H. medleri Alexander, 1976
H. melanophallus Alexander, 1938
H. mesorhynchus Alexander, 1933
H. micracanthus Alexander, 1945
H. mirabilis (Alexander, 1914)
H. mirandus (Alexander, 1921)
H. morosus (Alexander, 1920)
H. multivolus Alexander, 1945
H. murreensis Alexander, 1960
H. myersiellus Alexander, 1935
H. nawaianus Alexander, 1929
H. neocaledonicus Alexander, 1945
H. nigricapella Alexander, 1938
H. nigriceps (Edwards, 1916)
H. nipponensis (Alexander, 1913)
H. numenius Alexander, 1967
H. obliteratus (Alexander, 1920)
H. obsoletus (Alexander, 1920)
H. oxystylus Alexander, 1967
H. pallidipes Alexander, 1926
H. pallidissimus Alexander, 1930
H. pallirostris Edwards, 1921
H. panamensis Alexander, 1934
H. paramorosus Alexander, 1949
H. parvidens Alexander, 1944
H. patens Edwards, 1933
H. pauperculus (Alexander, 1921)
H. pavoninus Alexander, 1938
H. perflavens Alexander, 1964
H. perpallidus Alexander, 1942
H. pervenustus Alexander, 1953
H. phasmatis Alexander, 1945
H. pictus Edwards, 1926
H. plebeius Alexander, 1946
H. pluto Alexander, 1932
H. polionotus Alexander, 1938
H. procerus Alexander, 1931
H. productellus Alexander, 1944
H. protumidus Alexander, 1978
H. quadrifidus Alexander, 1926
H. quadrivena Alexander, 1971
H. rectispinus Alexander, 1947
H. rectus Alexander, 1945
H. regius Alexander, 1944
H. rostratus Alexander, 1956
H. rubicundus (Alexander, 1922)
H. rufescens (Edwards, 1916)
H. rufithorax Alexander, 1928
H. sanguinolentus (Alexander, 1921)
H. schildi Alexander, 1945
H. selectus Alexander, 1936
H. serenus Alexander, 1967
H. setigerus Alexander, 1980
H. sigillatus Alexander, 1964
H. stenorhynchus Alexander, 1954
H. stolidus Alexander, 1948
H. subanaemicus Alexander, 1964
H. subarcuarius Alexander, 1934
H. subfasciatus Alexander, 1924
H. submorosus (Alexander, 1921)
H. subobsoletus (Alexander, 1921)
H. subpauperculus Alexander, 1975
H. tantalus Alexander, 1967
H. tanyrhinus Alexander, 1964
H. taos Alexander, 1967
H. tenuirostris Alexander, 1924
H. tenuistylus Alexander, 1929
H. tetracradus Alexander, 1967
H. tienmuanus Alexander, 1940
H. tonaleah Theischinger, 1994
H. trianguliferus Alexander, 1931
H. tshinta Theischinger, 1994
H. unicolor (Brunetti, 1912)
H. uniformis (Alexander, 1914)
H. venustus (Skuse, 1890)
H. verticillatus Alexander, 1967
H. yindi Theischinger, 1994
Subgenus Idiohelius Alexander, 1948
H. melanolithus Alexander, 1953
H. mirificus Alexander, 1953
H. pentaneura Alexander, 1948
Subgenus Mammuthonasus Theischinger, 1994
H. allunga Theischinger, 1994
Subgenus Prohelius Alexander, 1975
H. dugaldi Alexander, 1945
H. edwardsianus Alexander, 1956
H. fulani Alexander, 1975
Subgenus Rhamphidina Alexander, 1920
H. camerounensis (Alexander, 1920)
Subgenus Rhamphidioides Alexander, 1920
H. alluaudi (Riedel, 1914)
H. venustissimus (Alexander, 1920)
Subgenus Rhampholimnobia Alexander, 1915
H. bigeminatus Alexander, 1962
H. brevinasus Alexander, 1934
H. deentoo Theischinger, 1994
H. diffusus Alexander, 1941
H. fenestratus Alexander, 1973
H. gracilirostris Alexander, 1962
H. guttulinus Alexander, 1960
H. japenensis Alexander, 1948
H. matilei Hynes, 1993
H. mesolineatus Alexander, 1962
H. nimbus Alexander, 1941
H. papuanus Alexander, 1934
H. reticularis (Alexander, 1915)
H. simulator Alexander, 1962
H. spinteris Alexander, 1960
H. subreticulatus Alexander, 1962
Subgenus Rhyncholimonia Alexander, 1964
H. dicroneurus Alexander, 1964

References

Nematocera genera
Diptera of Asia
Diptera of Australasia
Diptera of Europe
Diptera of North America
Diptera of South America
Limoniidae